John Munro (1798/99 – 24 April 1879) was a 19th-century Member of Parliament in the Auckland Province, New Zealand.

He was described as "an old Nova Scotia settler" of Waipu.

Biography

He represented the Marsden electorate from 1861 to 1866, when he was defeated. He then represented the electorate again from a by-election in 1869 to 1875, when he was again defeated.

He died on 24 April 1879, aged 80 years.

References

1790s births
1879 deaths
Members of the New Zealand House of Representatives
Unsuccessful candidates in the 1866 New Zealand general election
Unsuccessful candidates in the 1875–1876 New Zealand general election
New Zealand MPs for North Island electorates
19th-century New Zealand politicians